The Tonda languages form a branch of the Yam language family of southern New Guinea. There are over 10 languages.

Tonda languages share some areal features are shared with the Kolopom languages.

Languages
The Tonda languages are:

Tonda / West Morehead River
Arammba
Central Morehead River: Anta, Kómnzo, Wára, Wérè, Kémä, Kánchá
Warta Thuntai
Bensbach River
Upper Bensbach River
Mblafe–Ránmo
Ngarna–Rema
Nggarna (Sota)
Rema
Kanum
Ngkolmpu: Ngkâlmpw/Ngkontar, Bädi                        
South Kanum: Bârkâli-Smärki, Tämer

Notes (see Evans 2018: 681):
Each terminal bullet point lists a different dialect chain.
Ránmo is linguistically a dialect of Mblafe, but Ránmo speakers consider their language to be a separate, distinct language.
Wérè is linguistically a dialect of Wára, but Wèré speakers consider their language to be a separate, distinct language.

Numeral typology

Tonda languages are unique for their base-6 numeral systems, which likely originated from counting yams (rather than fingers or body parts as with most other languages).

References

External links 
 Timothy Usher, New Guinea World, Proto–West Morehead River (under construction 2020)

Further reading
Grummitt, John and Janell Masters. 2012. A Survey of the Tonda Sub-Group of Languages. SIL Electronic Survey Reports 2012-018.

 
Western Yam languages